"n Beetje" ("A little bit"), spelled in full as "Een beetje", is a song written in Dutch by Willy van Hemert, composed by Dick Schallies and performed by Teddy Scholten as the ' entry and winner of the Eurovision Song Contest 1959. The song was the second victory for the country in the first four years of the contest.

Composition
The song is more up-tempo than the previous winners had been, as well as being somewhat less serious. It is sung from the perspective of a young woman being asked by her lover if she is "true" and "faithful", to which she answers "A little bit". This unusual admission is then justified by the comment that "everyone is in love at least once", hence nobody can be said to be entirely faithful to anyone. Befitting the lyrics, the music has a lilt to it which had been missing from the previous winners. Scholten also recorded the song in German (as "Sei ehrlich"), French ("Un p'tit peu"), Italian ("Un poco") and Swedish ("Om våren"). She sang an English version for British television as "The Moment".

Eurovision Song Contest
At the 1959 edition of the annual Eurovision Song Contest, the song was performed fifth in a field of eleven countries, following 's Jacques Pills with "Mon ami Pierrot" and preceding 's Alice and Ellen Kessler with "Heute Abend wollen wir tanzen geh'n". By the close of voting, it had received 21 points, placing it first in a field of 11.

Reception
"Een beetje"'s Eurovision performance was called "excellent" and "surprisingly fresh" in an article published a few days after the contest by Dutch newspaper Eindhovens Dagblad, which added that its mid-show timing, after four entries with six more to go, already showcased it as standing out in the field and predicted to get a decent score. With that, it viewed that for some time it looked as though Switzerland and then the United Kingdom will swoop the win, while pointing that Italy was given the best chance to win prior to the evening; and as part of the article's big-lettered title, reviewed that the United Kingdom was a "tough competitor". In addition it opined that the entry's musical director, Dutch conductor Dolf van der Linden, didn't seem very enthusiastic with the melodic execution, by France's RTF orchestra.

DutchNews.nl described the song as having a "charming performance" by Scholten, a lively rhythm and lyrics peppered with wordplay which "added to the song’s musicality – even for those who did not speak Dutch", and altogether as the reasons the entry "won over everybody". However, it adds that Scholten was a "surprising winner" since the "growing army of Eurovision pundits put their bets on the UK entry" performed by Pearl Carr and Teddy Johnson, whom it viewed as a potential "English equivalent" of Scholten and her fellow artist husband Henk.

Comparing the song to the previous 1956-1958 contests winners, entertainment website Screen Rant reviewed it in 2021 as having "a bit more innocuous" lyrics, reflecting the writers' "inherently self-effacing nature", a "faster pace" music and noting "energy" in Scholten's performance. It concludes those to "prove" the entry as "among the most influential Eurovision songs to date" as well as the first Eurovision entry to "hint at what the identity of the contest would come to be"; bearing ingredients of the contest's styles and popularity celebrated nowadays.

References

External links 
 Official Eurovision Song Contest site, history by year, 1959
 Detailed info and lyrics, Diggiloo Thrush, "Een beetje"

Eurovision songs of the Netherlands
Dutch-language songs
Eurovision songs of 1959
Eurovision Song Contest winning songs
Songs with lyrics by Willy van Hemert
Philips Records singles
1959 songs